EICAR may refer to:

 École Internationale de Création Audiovisuelle et de Réalisation, a film school in Paris
 European Institute for Computer Antivirus Research
 EICAR test file
 EICAR (antiviral)